Karl Bergmann (June 7, 1907 – August 21, 1979) was a German politician of the Social Democratic Party (SPD) and former member of the German Bundestag.

Life 
Bergmann was a member of the state parliament of North Rhine-Westphalia from 1946 to 1950. He had been a member of the German Bundestag since the first federal elections in 1949 to 1972. He represented the constituency Essen II in parliament.

From 27 February 1958 to 21 January 1970 Bergmann was also a member of the European Parliament.

Literature

References

1907 births
1979 deaths
Members of the Bundestag for North Rhine-Westphalia
Members of the Bundestag 1969–1972
Members of the Bundestag 1965–1969
Members of the Bundestag 1961–1965
Members of the Bundestag 1957–1961
Members of the Bundestag 1953–1957
Members of the Bundestag 1949–1953
Members of the Bundestag for the Social Democratic Party of Germany
Members of the Landtag of North Rhine-Westphalia
MEPs for Germany 1958–1979
Social Democratic Party of Germany MEPs